Gailey is a small village in Staffordshire, England.  It is at the junction of the A5 and A449 roads, and is on the boundary of the parishes of Brewood and Coven (formerly Brewood) and Penkridge, in South Staffordshire.

The village was in existence at the time of the Domesday Book (1086) when it was referred to as Gragelie.  In the 19th century, Gailey was also known as Spread Eagle, from the name of the pub adjacent to the road junction.

In 1837, the Grand Junction Railway built a railway station in the village.  The Rugby-Birmingham-Stafford Line still passes through the site, although the station at Gailey closed in 1951.  Today the village is served by Select Bus service 877/878 which operates between Wolverhampton and Stafford.

See also
Gailey Reservoir

References

Villages in Staffordshire
South Staffordshire District
Penkridge